Everything Was Forever is a studio album by British indie rock band Sea Power, released in February 2022 on the band's own Golden Chariot label. It was the band's first album in five years, and the first since changing their name from British Sea Power. The songs "Two Fingers" and "Folly" were released as singles.

The album was named after Alexei Yurchak's 2005 book Everything was Forever, Until it was No More: The Last Soviet Generation.

Production 
Sea Power began writing songs in late 2019, but this was interrupted by the COVID-19 pandemic and the album was completed in phases. It was influenced by the deaths of Jan and Neil's parents, with the single "Two Fingers" being a tribute to their father. For the first time since 2011's Valhalla Dancehall the band worked with producer Graham Sutton, who determined the final track listing when they could not agree which of the 20 in-progress songs to include.

Critical reception 

Everything Was Forever received generally positive reviews from critics noted at review aggregator Metacritic. It has a weighted average score of 79 out of 100, based on eight reviews. AllMusic called it "as bold and inspired as their best work".

The album was placed 6th in The Quietus album of the year list, and 9th in the end of year list by Louder Than War.

Chart performance

Track listing

References 

British Sea Power albums
2022 albums